The Denison, Bonham and New Orleans Railroad was a railroad company based in Denison, Texas, U.S.A. which was chartered in 1887. It was nicknamed "Nellie".  The DB&NO operated on track between Bonham Junction on the Missouri-Kansas-Texas Railroad east of Denison and its southeastern terminus with the Texas and Pacific Railway in Bonham, Texas. in 1901 it was building between Bonham and Wolfe City, but work on this was abandoned.

It made stops in the communities of Ambrose and Ravenna. The railroad ceased operations in 1928.

The track through Bonham was completed in 1891.  The railroad ended up totaling  of track.  The Missouri-Kansas-Texas Railroad operated the railroad and later leased it.  In 1923 the M-K-T gave up its interest in the line and for two years was operated under receivership.  In 1925, several Bonham citizens purchased the line but in 1928 the line was shut down and abandoned.

References

The Truman Area Community Network – Corporate History: Missouri Kansas & Texas Railway – Denison, Bonham and New Orleans Railroad Company "This corporate history does not include the reorganization of 1923 and subsequent corporate changes."
Herald Democrat, 2006-07-30 Historical events in Grayson County, as recorded in “History of Grayson County Texas by Grayson County Frontier Village”: “Ambrose, Texas History,” by Mrs. Tony Pace and Mrs. Ruth Whitlock

Defunct Texas railroads
Grayson County, Texas
Fannin County, Texas
Predecessors of the Missouri–Kansas–Texas Railroad
Railway companies established in 1901
Railway companies disestablished in 1928